Super.com (previously Snapcommerce) is a technology company headquartered in San Francisco, that focuses on fintech, travel, and commerce. It was rebranded in October 2022 from Snapcommerce to Super.com.

History 
Super.com was officially founded under the name Snapcommerce by Hussein Fazal and Henry Shi in April 2016. In July of the same year, the company raised $1.2 million during a seed round. The company’s first project was Snaptravel, a platform for finding and booking hotels. 

In 2017, the company received investments of a total of $8 million.

In 2019, the company got funded by Steph Curry.

In 2019, Henry Shi, the cofounder of SuperTravel, was listed in Forbes 30 Under 30.

In December 2021, Snapcommerce launched a platform SnapShop for finding products.

In 2021, according to Deloitte the company was named the 5th Fastest Growing Company in North America. It raised raised $85 million in Series B round in the same year.

In October 2022, Snaptravel was renamed to SuperTravel, the parent company Snapcommerce to Super, and switched the commerce industry to fintech, while the domain name Super.com was acquired for an undisclosed amount.

It got low reviews on several review websites like Sitejabber or Scam-detector.

References 

Companies based in San Francisco
Financial services companies established in 2016
Companies based in Toronto
Travel ticket search engines